YMCA in Columbus, Georgia, located at 124 11th St., was built in 1903.  It was listed on the National Register of Historic Places in 1980.

It is a building of YMCA of Metropolitan Columbus.  It is a three-story building, Classical Revival in style.

It was funded by donation from George Foster Peabody and was believed to be the only marble YMCA building in America.

References

YMCA buildings in the United States
National Register of Historic Places in Muscogee County, Georgia
Neoclassical architecture in Georgia (U.S. state)
Buildings and structures completed in 1903